The BYU–Hawaii Seasiders men's basketball team represented Brigham Young University–Hawaii in NCAA Division II college basketball play. The team attended 6 NAIA Tournaments and 11 NCAA D2 Tournaments. The Seasiders participated as members of the Pacific West Conference.

History
BYU-Hawaii fielded its first collegiate basketball team in 1978.  As members of the NAIA, they were able to develop early rivalries with fellow state schools Chaminade University of Honolulu, Hawaii Pacific University, and University of Hawaii at Hilo.  In their 39-year history, the Seasiders won 761 games, 56.5% of the games they played. The Seasiders were also one of the founders of the Pacific West Conference.

While in the NAIA, BYU-Hawaii made the tournament 6 times, Four of those appearances occurred under coach Ken Wagner. In his second season, Wagner led BYU-Hawaii to the 1992 NAIA Final Four. Wagner would lead the Seasiders back to the NAIA Playoffs in 1996, 1997, and 1998 with two second round appearances and a first round appearance.

The Seasiders would transition to NCAA D2 status in the 1998–99 season.

In April 2014, BYU-Hawaii announced that it was phasing out all intercollegiate sports to concentrate on recruiting international students.  The 2016-17 season was the Seasiders' last.

Coaches

Individual honors

National Player of the Year
Lucas Alves (2008–09)

Conference Player of the Year
Lucas Alves (2007–08, 2008–09, 2009–10)
Marques Whippy (2010–11)

All-Americans
Chang Tsung-hsien (2010–11)

Individual records
Marques Whippy (2007–2011) – 245 steals

See also
2012–13 BYU–Hawaii Seasiders men's basketball team
2013–14 BYU–Hawaii Seasiders men's basketball team

References

External links
BYU-Hawaii Seasiders Official Site

 
Basketball teams established in 1978
Basketball teams disestablished in 2017
1978 establishments in Hawaii
2017 disestablishments in Hawaii